Jade Wu (born January 5, 1953) is a Japanese-born Chinese-American actress, playwright, producer, director, and editor. She is the granddaughter of actor and director, Yuanlong Wang, known for his work in Hong Kong, China and Taiwan. Throughout the course of her career, Wu has notably worked for the ABC daytime drama series General Hospital and One Life to Live while also working as a fellow writer for Disney. She has scripted and directed many documentary films that have screened at the IFP Market, Asian American International Film Festival, Sundance Producers Conference, and the Anthology Film Archives in New York City. As a writer she has also had her own plays read at the Santa Clara Experimental Theater Festival and La Jolla Studio Stage. Wu has also served as a panelist for National Endowment for the Arts, New York State Council on the Arts and Individual Artist Grant, as well as serving as a juror for an International Emmy Award.

Early life 
Jade Wu was born January 5, 1953, in Tokyo, Japan and was born into a family of Chinese heritage. She was the daughter of a soldier and spent much of her childhood traveling while her father was serving in the United States Army. Her family later settled in the United States where her father began work at Capitol Hill. Wu spent much of her childhood living in Washington, D.C. and considers it to be where she was raised, despite the many places she had lived before hand. Many years later she moved to California.

Education 
After moving to the west coast, Wu attended the University of California, San Diego. Working towards medical school, Wu began research after her first year enrolled as a student but realized that she also wanted to pursue an MFA in theater. There, over time she developed the accents of standard English, British/Polish/Slovakian and some fluency in Cantonese and Mandarin. Wu graduated with a BS in Biochemistry, a BA in Humanities, a BA in Drama, and an MFA in Acting and Directing. She also later received a certification in video/film editing from The Edit Center, and an AA in science and humanities from Mira Costa College.

Before entertainment 
After graduating, Jade Wu moved to New York City to pursue her dream as an actress and/or director. Upon her arrival, however, she could not find a job. There were no roles or positions for Asian Americans on television at the time, and if there were they were too small to benefit from financially. Because of the lack of opportunities, Wu got involved in commercialism and later found herself in the corporate realm of public relations and advertising. Through this period of her youth, she became skilled in image and visibility in both public and private sector campaigns. She became well-versed in international diplomacy and formalizing relationships as well as gaining interest in social, cultural, human, and environmental causes. During this time Wu also, further developed her specialties of public speaking, writing narratives/scripts/essays/journals, food styling and photography.

Acting career 
Wu did not get involved with showbiz until 20 years after her move from the west coast. It was not until one of her old headshots happened to end up in a Homicide: Life on the Street episodic casting office that she finally surfaced within Hollywood. At the time, the show was shooting in Baltimore, Maryland. The executives called her in for an audition as they were looking for a Korean immigrant. Even during the late 1990s roles for Asian American actors were so sparse that it was rare to find trained Asians who were adequately eligible for the position posted. Wu was awarded a recurring role on the show, officially introducing her to the professional arena of television.

Jade Wu has since then, worked with actors such as; Meryl Streep, Kevin Kline, George C. Wolf, Austin Pendleton, Jeanine Tesori, Jenifer Lewis, Ato Essandoh, Fred Weller, Geoff Arends, Tony Kushner, Ridley Scott, Will Smith, Gene Hackman, Tony Gilroy, Warren Leight, Paul McGuigan, Guerrmo Navarro, Vincenzo Natali, Peter Leto, Clark Johnson, Frank Prinzi, Tom Fontana and Barry Levinson. Wu also had recurring roles on One Life to Live, Law & Order: Criminal Intent, Bull, and The Blacklist. She has performed on stage as well, working in Off-Broadway theatre productions at The Public, Delacorte Theatre in Central Park, Urban Stages, Bank St. Theatre, Minetta Lane, The Wilma Theatre, Arena Stage, Shakespeare Theatre Washington DC, and La Jolla Stage. Wu played the lead role of Ahma Chin in a Sundance Sundance pedigree independent film, The Motel, which won the Humanitas Prize and an Independent Spirit Award Nomination. She has worked with stage directors such as Alan Schneider, Liv Ciuilei, JoAnne Akalaitis, Gerald Gutierrez, Wendy Goldberg, Blanka Zizka and David Muse among others. 

From 2016 to 2018 Wu played Connie Lin in the Marvel Original Luke Cageon Netflix. In 2016 Wu had a recurring role as Judge Cara Bergen in the CBS series Bull with Michael Weatherly and as Katie's Mom in the HBO series Divorce with Sara Jessica Parker and Thomas Hayden Church. In 2018, Wu played one of the leads in the film Snakehead along with Sung Kang and Shuya Chang.

Television 
 For Life (TV series) (Judge Julie Tanaka) - ABC
 Manifest (TV series) (Angela Graham) - NBC
 Snakehead (Dai Mah) – Arowana Films
 Elementary (TV series) (Woman) – CBS
 Divorce (Katie's Mom) – HBO
 Bull (Judge Cara Bergen) – CBS
 Luke Cage (Connie Lin) – ABC/Marvel/Netflix
 Limitless (Mary Wu)- CBS/ Sony
 The Blacklist (Chinese Cabal Delegate Rec)- NBC/USA TV
 The Motel (Ahma)- El Fan Coco/Shapiro Entertainment
 One Life to Live (Dr. Amelia Chen) - ABC Daytime TV
 Law & Order: Criminal Intent (Mrs. Kaoru Mlyazaki) (Irene Chang)
 The Jury (Maeve Lil Sock)
 One Life to Live (Judith Chen)
 Asian American (Self)
 Homicide: Life on the Street (Sun-Rae Roh)

Stage 
 Washer/Dryer (Dr.Lee)
 Like Shadows (Boss)
 U.S. Premiere Chimerica (Feng Mehui) (Ming Xoali)
 Mother Courage (Farmers Wife)
 2752 (solo performance)
 Memes in the Membrane (solo performance)
 Red (Sonya Wong Pickford)
 Book of Days (Sharon Bates)
 The Shanghai Gesture (Mother God Damn)
 Barriers (Naima)
 Trojan Women (Pallas Athena)(Hecuba US)
 Primary English Class (Mrs. Pong/Translator)

Teaching 
Jade Wu was a return lecturer at Bard College from February 2005 up until February 2007 where she lectured on the relations of Michel Foucault's philosophies in “Fearless Speech” and dramatic conflict and conversation in plays for the school's theater and social human justice departments. She has also taught at the Fashion Institute of Technology, Cal State East Bay and Raul Julia Performing Arts Institute.

Awards 
 Disney/ABC Fellowship
 BlueCat Semi-finalist
 PEN USA Rosenthal Emerging Writers finalist
 Edinburgh Festival Best Actress Nomination
 Jerome Media Fellowship

References

Sources 
 "Jade Wu | LinkedIn." N.p., n.d. Web. 10 Nov. 2016.
 "Creative-artist." Creative-artist. N.p., n.d. Web. 10 Nov. 2016.
 Hyun. "Jade Wu in The Motel." Asiance July 2006: n. pag. Print.

University of California, San Diego alumni
American actresses of Chinese descent
American dramatists and playwrights
Living people
1953 births
21st-century American women